These are the official results of the athletics competition at the 2007 Pan Arab Games which took place on 21–24 November 2007 in Cairo, Egypt.

Men's results

100 meters

Heats – 21 November

Final – 22 NovemberWind: +0.7 m/s

200 meters

Heats – 23 NovemberWind:Heat 1: +1.0 m/s, Heat 2: +1.0 m/s, Heat 3: -1.0 m/s

Final – 24 NovemberWind:+2.0 m/s

400 meters

Heats – 21 November

Final – 22 November

800 meters
22 November

1500 meters
24 November

5000 meters
24 November

10,000 meters
21 November

Half marathon
23 November

110 meters hurdles
Heats – 21 NovemberWind:Heat 1: 0.0 m/s, Heat 2: +0.7 m/s

Final – 22 NovemberWind:+1.1 m/s

400 meters hurdles
24 November

3000 meters steeplechase
23 November

4 x 100 meters relay
23 November

4 x 400 meters relay
24 November

20,000 metres walk
21 November

High jump
24 November

Pole vault
22 November

Long jump
21 November

Triple jump
23 November

Shot put
21 November

Discus throw
22 November

Hammer throw
23 November

Javelin throw
24 November

Decathlon
November 23–24

Women's results

100 meters

Heats – 21 November

Final – 22 NovemberWind: +1.4 m/s

200 meters
24 NovemberWind: +1.4 m/s

400 meters
22 November

800 meters
22 November

1500 meters
24 November

5000 meters
22 November

10,000 meters
23 November

Half marathon
23 November

100 metres hurdles
22 NovemberWind: +1.2 m/s

400 metres hurdles
24 November

3000 meters steeplechase
21 November

4 x 100 meters relay
23 November

4 x 400 meters relay
24 November

10,000 metres walk
22 November

High jump
22 November

Pole vault
23 November

Long jump
21 November

Triple jump
24 November

Shot put
22 November

Discus throw
21 November

Hammer throw
24 November

Javelin throw
23 November

Heptathlon
November 21–22

References

Results

Pan Arab Games
2007